Reuschel is a surname. Notable people with the surname include:

Paul Reuschel (born 1947), American baseball player
Rick Reuschel (born 1949), American baseball player, brother of Paul

See also
Donner & Reuschel, German bank
Bankhaus Reuschel & Co., German bank
Ruschel